The Brigadier General Thomas F. Barr Award is a unit trophy annually awarded by the United States Army to a military police unit working with the United States Army Corrections Command. It was first awarded in 2009.

History

The Brigadier General Thomas F. Barr Award, first issued in 2009, is annually awarded to the all-around best Military Police unit of company-size or smaller "attached to, or supporting" the United States Army Corrections Command. According to the U.S. Army, the "award is intended to promote professionalism and esprit de corps by recognizing the unit that displays the most outstanding performance over a 12-month period".

The award is considered a unit trophy as provided for in Army Regulation 600–8–22. Units are scored against several specific criteria including the unit's Army Physical Fitness Test and weapons qualification averages, educational attainment levels of its personnel, community involvement, and unit and individual soldier accomplishments such as deployments and commendations. It is considered "very competitive".

Namesake
The Brigadier General Thomas F. Barr Award is named after Thomas Francis Barr (1837–1916) who served in the Judge Advocate General Corps from 1865 to 1901. Barr was, for 21 years, a commissioner of the United States Disciplinary Barracks at Fort Leavenworth, Kansas, and was also the personal adviser to United States Secretary of War Robert Todd Lincoln. On May 21, 1901, Barr was promoted to brigadier general and named Judge Advocate General of the United States. He retired the following day. Barr was the father-in-law of Colonel Francis Tompkins, the great-great-nephew of Vice President of the United States Daniel D. Tompkins.

Recipients

See also
 Awards and decorations of the United States Armed Forces
 United States Army Provost Marshal General

References

Awards and decorations of the United States Army
United States Army Corrections Command
Awards established in 2009
2009 establishments in the United States
Prison officer awards